Feng Yujiu was a Chinese diplomat. He was Ambassador of the People's Republic of China to Norway (1965–1967), Mauritania (1969–1973), Nigeria (1973–1979) and Hungary (1979–1983).

Ambassadors of China to Norway
Ambassadors of China to Mauritania
Ambassadors of China to Nigeria
Ambassadors of China to Hungary
Possibly living people
Year of birth missing